Charitosemia is a genus of moths of the family Noctuidae.

Species
 Charitosemia albigutta Karsch, 1895
 Charitosemia geraldi Kirby, 1896

References
 Charitosemia at Markku Savela's Lepidoptera and Some Other Life Forms
 Natural History Museum Lepidoptera genus database

Agaristinae